Józef Kotlarczyk (13 February 1907 – 28 September 1959) was a Polish football forward, who capped 30 times for the national team of Poland (1931–1937).

Kotlarczyk began his career in a local team Nadwiślan Kraków, and in 1927 moved to Wisła Kraków, where he played until 1939, scoring 13 goals in 244 games. He was the captain of Wisła, as well as of the Poland national team. In 1936 he played for Poland during the 1936 Summer Olympics. At first, Kotlarczyk was a forward, then moved to midfield. He was a very aggressive player, always keen on attacking the opponent.

References

External links

 

1907 births
1959 deaths
Burials at Rakowicki Cemetery
Polish footballers
Poland international footballers
Olympic footballers of Poland
Footballers at the 1936 Summer Olympics
Footballers from Kraków
Wisła Kraków players
Polish Austro-Hungarians
People from the Kingdom of Galicia and Lodomeria
Association football midfielders